Phodoryctis stephaniae is a moth of the family Gracillariidae. It is known from Japan (Honshū, Shikoku and the Ryukyu Islands), Nepal and Taiwan.

The wingspan is 5.8-8.1 mm.

The larvae feed on Stephania species, including Stephania japonica. They probably mine the leaves of their host plant.

References

Acrocercopinae
Moths of Japan
Moths described in 1988